Munting Heredera (International title: Little Heiress) is a Philippine television drama series broadcast by GMA Network. Directed by Maryo J. de los Reyes, it stars Gloria Romero. It premiered on May 9, 2011 on the network's Telebabad line up replacing Dwarfina. The series concluded on February 3, 2012 with a total of 195 episodes. It was replaced by Biritera in its timeslot.

Cast and characters

Lead cast
 Gloria Romero as Anastacia "Ana" Montereal-Lobregat

Supporting cast
 Mark Anthony Fernandez as Jacob Montereal
 Camille Prats as Sandra Santiago-Montereal/Susan Velasco 
 Katrina Halili as Lynette Sarmiento-Montereal
 Roderick Paulate as Emmanuel "Manny" Mejia
 Mona Louise Rey as Jennifer "Jenny" S. Montereal
 Gabby Eigenmann as Desmond Montereal / Michael Sison
 Leandro Baldemor as Philip Arboleda
 Ynez Veneracion as Claire Montereal  
 Neil Ryan Sese as Simeon Velasco 
 Krystal Reyes as Gemmalyn "Gemma" Sarmiento
 Kristofer Martin as Timothy James "TJ" Navarro-Arboleda
 Joyce Ching as Kyla Montereal
 Luz Valdez as Maria Montereal
 Barbara Miguel as Calilla S. Arboleda
 Kyle Ocampo  as Michelle S. Velasco

Guest cast
 Robert Arevalo as Enrique Lobregat
 Boots Anson-Roa as Ingrid Spencer-Lobregat
 Bobby Andrews as Stanley Lobregat
 Andrea del Rosario as Kate Lobregat
 Jesus Ramon as Allen Lobregat 
 Rammy Bitong as Marlon
 Miggs Cuaderno as Tonton
 Matet de Leon as Helen
 Deborah Sun as Meding
 Sharmaine Arnaiz as Maritess / Lulu
 Elijah Alejo as Abigail
 Sue Prado as Nerissa 
 Marita Zobel as Veronica
 Shiela Marie Rodriguez as Pipa
 Julio Diaz as Toto
 Kryshee Grengia as Nini
 Nathaniel Britt as Bugoy
 Madeleine Nicolas as Aurora

Remake
In 2016, Munting Heredera was slated to have an adaptation in Mexico, marking the first drama series by GMA Network to be adapted by a Latin country. It will be produced by Telefilm Atlantico S.A.

Ratings
According to AGB Nielsen Philippines' Mega Manila household television ratings, the final episode scored a 27.7% rating.

Accolades

References

External links
 

2011 Philippine television series debuts
2012 Philippine television series endings
Filipino-language television shows
GMA Network drama series
Television shows set in Manila